Sleepwalker is the sixteenth studio album by the English rock group, the Kinks, released in 1977. It marked a return to straight-ahead, self-contained rock songs after several years of concept albums. It is the first album in what critics usually call the "arena rock" phase of the group, in which more commercial and mainstream production techniques would be employed. The album also marks the last appearance of bassist John Dalton, who left the band during the recording sessions. Dalton plays bass on all songs on the album save for "Mr. Big Man".  The lineup of the Kinks would be trimmed down significantly in 1977 following the album's release, as the brass section and backup singers were removed and the band returned to a standard rock band outfit.

It was their first album for the Arista label.

Background
Despite their success with the hit singles "Lola" and "Apeman" in 1970, the Kinks had less and less commercial success throughout the 1970s, largely attributed to bandleader Ray Davies's shift toward concept albums and a theatrical sound for the band. After the release of the band's more rock-oriented 1975 album, Schoolboys in Disgrace, the Kinks switched labels from RCA Records to Clive Davis' Arista Records, signaling a transition toward less theatrical material.

Following the band's signing to Arista, plans for a new album began to emerge. Just prior to the album's recording, the band's Konk Studios was equipped with a new 24-track recorder. Davies said to Melody Maker in 1976 of the then-upcoming recording sessions for a new Kinks album, "Yes, I am looking forward to it, because the situation is right. It's a great studio; I'm proud of it."

Recording
Beginning in May 1976, the band began rehearsing new material (up to thirty new tracks) Ray Davies had penned, with twenty songs attempted by the band. Rejected song titles included "Power of Gold", "Stagefright", "Restless", and "Elevator Man", the latter being used by Ray Davies on the 1994 EP Waterloo Sunset '94. Throughout July 1976, recordings of multiple songs were recorded (though most were rejected), including the album's "Juke Box Music", "Life on the Road", and "Brother", future follow-up album Misfits' "Hay Fever" and "In a Foreign Land", B-sides "Prince of the Punks" and "Artificial Light" (flipsides to "Father Christmas" and "A Rock 'n' Roll Fantasy", respectively), and the rejected "Back to 64 / Decade", "Lazy Day", and "The Poseur", the latter released on the CD reissue of the album.

In September, more songs for the album were recorded, including "Full Moon", "Sleepwalker", "Sleepless Night", and "Life Goes On". Rejects "Child Bride", "Everything Is Alright", "One Woman Man", and "On the Outside" (the latter appearing both on the CD reissue of Sleepwalker and, in another form, on Waterloo Sunset '94) were also made. In October, new versions of "Juke Box Music" and "Life on the Road" were recorded, as well as the new "Stormy Sky". Another Misfits song, "Black Messiah", was also attempted, but was held off the album. During this time, longtime bassist John Dalton left the band, citing his lack of family time, the stresses of the road, and low pay as reasons. Overdubs by the remaining four-piece were added throughout the rest of October and November.

To replace Dalton, ex-Blodwyn Pig bassist Andy Pyle was added to the group. The band then recorded "Mr. Big Man" in December, which, when added to the album's running order, replaced "In a Foreign Land".

Release and reception

Sleepwalker was released during February 1977 in both the US and UK. Although the album, like all Kinks albums since 1967's Something Else by The Kinks, failed to chart in the UK, the album proved to be a success in the US, reaching #21 on the Billboard 200. That following March, the title track of the album, backed with "Full Moon", reached #48 in the US, becoming the first Kinks single to reach the Billboard Hot 100 since "Apeman" in 1970. Its follow-up single, "Juke Box Music", failed to make an impact. Although Clive Davis had originally pushed for "Brother" to be released as a single, comparing its appeal to that of Simon and Garfunkel's "Bridge over Troubled Water", it never saw an official single release.

Critical reaction to the album was generally positive, an improvement on the band's previous reception during their theatrical incarnation. Sleepwalker was lauded by Billy Altman of Rolling Stone, who said, "The Kinks' playing on Sleepwalker is easily their most powerful since 'Lola'. In the UK, Allan Jones in Melody Maker praised the album, saying, that Sleepwalker "emphatically testifies to the dramatic artistic revival of Raymond Douglas Davies, whose supreme talents as a writer have been so distressingly overlooked during the first half of [the 1970s]. [Sleepwalker] really is the group's strongest and most organised album in years." Giovanni Dadomo of Sounds was less approving, saying, "it's not the great new album one always hopes for."

Track listing

Personnel
The Kinks

Ray Davies – lead and backing vocals, guitar and keyboards
Dave Davies – lead guitar, backing and harmony vocals, lead vocals on "Sleepless Night", co-lead vocals on "Juke Box Music"
John Dalton – bass guitar (except where noted)
John Gosling – keyboards and backing vocals
Mick Avory – drums, percussion

Additional musicians
Andy Pyle – bass on "Mr. Big Man"

Technical
Roger Wake – engineer
James Wedge – photography
Bob Heimall – design
John Dyer – art direction
Hal Fiedler – calligraphy

References
Citations

Sources
 
 

1977 albums
The Kinks albums
Arista Records albums
Albums produced by Ray Davies